Guillermo "Guille" Méndez Pereiro (born 31 January 1992) is a Spanish footballer who plays for CD Praviano as a forward.

Club career
Méndez was born in San Esteban de Pravia, Asturias. A product of Sporting de Gijón's prolific youth academy, Mareo, he made it to the B-team during the 2010–11 season at the age of 18, with the side playing in the third division.

Méndez made his first-team – and La Liga – debut on 21 November 2010, entering the pitch in the 81st minute of a 0–1 away loss against CA Osasuna. In the following months, he continued to appear exclusively for the reserves.

In January 2012, Méndez moved to neighbouring Marino de Luanco (third level), on loan until end of the campaign.

References

External links

1992 births
Living people
People from Avilés (comarca)
Spanish footballers
Footballers from Asturias
Association football forwards
La Liga players
Segunda División B players
Tercera División players
Sporting de Gijón B players
Sporting de Gijón players
Marino de Luanco footballers
Rayo Cantabria players
Real Avilés CF footballers
UP Langreo footballers
Spain youth international footballers